The 72nd Annual Tony Awards were held on June 10, 2018, to recognize achievement in Broadway productions during the 2017–18 season. The ceremony was held at Radio City Music Hall in New York City, and was broadcast live by CBS. Sara Bareilles and Josh Groban served as hosts.

The Band's Visit was the most winning production of the season, with 10 awards, including Best Musical, Best Actor in a Leading Role in a Musical for Tony Shalhoub, Best Actress in a Leading Role in a Musical for Katrina Lenk, and Best Actor in a Featured Role in a Musical for Ari'el Stachel. Harry Potter and the Cursed Child won six awards, including Best Play, while Angels in America won three, including Best Revival of a Play.

The ceremony received positive reviews, with many highlighting the performances of Bareilles and Groban as hosts. At the 71st Primetime Emmy Awards, it was nominated for four awards Outstanding Variety Special (Live), Outstanding Technical Direction, Camerawork, Video Control for a Limited Series, Movie, or Special, Outstanding Lighting Design / Lighting Direction for a Variety Special and Outstanding Original Music and Lyrics.

Eligibility

The official eligibility cut-off date for Broadway productions opening in the 2017–2018 season was April 26, 2018.

Original plays
1984
The Children
Farinelli and the King
Harry Potter and the Cursed Child
John Lithgow: Stories by Heart
Junk
Latin History for Morons
Meteor Shower
The Parisian Woman
The Terms of My Surrender

Original musicals
The Band's Visit
Escape to Margaritaville
Frozen
Mean Girls
Prince of Broadway
SpongeBob SquarePants
Summer: The Donna Summer Musical

Play revivals
Angels in America
Children of a Lesser God
The Iceman Cometh
Lobby Hero
M. Butterfly
Marvin's Room
Saint Joan
Three Tall Women
Time and the Conways
Travesties

Musical revivals
Carousel
My Fair Lady
Once on This Island

Notes
 In November 2017, the Broadway production of 1984, which ran from May 18 through October 8, 2017 at the Hudson Theatre, was deemed ineligible for competition at the 72nd Tony Awards. In April 2018, the Tony Awards Administration Committee reversed its decision and allowed 1984 to be considered for nominations.

Awards events

Nominations
The Tony Award nominations were announced on May 1, 2018 by Hamilton alum Leslie Odom Jr. and Katharine McPhee, who was starring in Waitress on Broadway at the time.

Mean Girls and SpongeBob SquarePants each received 12 nominations, tying as the most-nominated shows of the season. The Band's Visit received 11 nominations, as did the revivals of Angels in America and Carousel. Harry Potter and the Cursed Child and the Lincoln Center Theater revival of My Fair Lady each received ten nominations.

Angels in America broke the record for most nominations for a play in Tony Awards history with 11 nominations, beating the record previously held by 2007's The Coast of Utopia and the 2010 revival of Fences.

Other events 
The annual Meet the Nominees Press Reception took place on May 2, 2018, at the InterContinental New York Hotel. The annual Nominees Luncheon took place on May 22, 2018, at the Rainbow Room. A cocktail party was held on June 4, 2018, at the Sofitel New York Hotel to celebrate the season's Tony Honors for Excellence in the Theatre and Special Award recipients.

Creative Arts Awards
The Creative Arts Tony Awards were presented prior to the televised ceremony. The hosts are Brandon Victor Dixon and Marissa Jaret Winokur. This ceremony presents awards in technical categories and several previously announced special awards.

Ceremony

Presenters
The ceremony's presenters included:

 Rachel Bloom – backstage presenter
 Kerry Washington – presented Best Actor in a Play
 Tina Fey – introduced Mean Girls
 Carey Mulligan – presented Best Featured Actress in a Play
 Amy Schumer – introduced My Fair Lady
 Billy Joel – presented Special Tony Award to Bruce Springsteen
 Tituss Burgess – presented Best Featured Actress in a Musical
 Ethan Slater – introduced SpongeBob SquarePants
 Erich Bergen and Katharine McPhee – presented Best Book of a Musical
 Tatiana Maslany – presented Best Featured Actor in a Play
 Mikhail Baryshnikov – introduced Carousel
 Uzo Aduba – presented Best Featured Actor in a Musical
 Ming-Na Wen – presented Excellence in Theatre Education Award
 Matthew Morrison – introduced Marjory Stoneman Douglas High School drama department

 Patti LuPone – special presentation on the Tonys' history
 Claire Danes – presented Best Actress in a Play
 James Monroe Iglehart – introduced Frozen
 Chita Rivera and Andrew Lloyd Webber – presented Best Direction of a Musical
 Jeff Daniels – presented Best Direction of a Play
 Christopher Jackson – presenter of the In Memoriam tribute
 Amanda Sudano, Brooklyn Sudano, and Mimi Sommer – introduced Summer: The Donna Summer Musical
 Matt Bomer, Jim Parsons, Zachary Quinto, Andrew Rannells – presented Best Play
 Melissa Benoist – introduced Once on This Island
 John Leguizamo – presented Best Revival of a Play
 Rachel Brosnahan – introduced The Band's Visit
 Brandon Victor Dixon and Marissa Jaret Winokur – presenters of the Creative Arts winners
 Christine Baranski – presented Best Revival of a Musical
 Robert De Niro – introduced Bruce Springsteen
 Kelli O'Hara – presented Best Actor in a Musical
 Leslie Odom Jr. – presented Best Actress in a Musical
 Bernadette Peters – presented Best Musical

Performances
The following shows and individuals performed on the ceremony's telecast:

"This One's for You" – Sara Bareilles and Josh Groban
"Where Do You Belong?" / "Meet the Plastics" – Mean Girls
"The Rain in Spain" / "I Could Have Danced All Night" / "Get Me to the Church on Time" – My Fair Lady
"Bikini Bottom Day" (with new lyrics) / "I'm Not a Loser" – SpongeBob SquarePants
"8 Times a Week" (parody of "Chandelier" by Sia) – Bareilles and Groban
"Blow High, Blow Low" – Carousel
"Seasons of Love" – Marjory Stoneman Douglas High School drama department

"For the First Time in Forever" / "Let It Go" – Frozen
Chita Rivera and Andrew Lloyd Webber medley – Bareilles and Groban
"For Forever" – Dear Evan Hansen
"Last Dance" – Summer: The Donna Summer Musical
"One Small Girl" / "Mama Will Provide" – Once on This Island
"Omar Sharif" – The Band's Visit
"My Hometown" – Bruce Springsteen
"This One's for the Dreamers" – Bareilles and Groban

Non-competitive awards
The Tony Award for Lifetime Achievement in the Theatre was presented to Chita Rivera and Andrew Lloyd Webber.

The Tony Honors for Excellence in Theatre was awarded to photographer Sara Krulwich, costume beader Bessie Nelson, and Broadway dry cleaning service Ernest Winzer Cleaners.

The Excellence in Theatre Education Award was presented to Melody Herzfeld of Marjory Stoneman Douglas High School.

The Isabelle Stevenson Award was presented to Nick Scandalios, who is the Executive Vice President of the Nederlander Organization.

The Regional Theatre Tony Award was awarded to La MaMa E.T.C. (Experimental Theatre Club) of New York City, which has a monetary grant of $25,000.

The Special Tony Award was given to John Leguizamo and Bruce Springsteen.

Winners and nominees 
Source:

‡ The award is presented to the producer(s) of the musical or play.

± The Tony Awards for Best Sound Design of a Play and of a Musical were reinstated for the 72nd Tony Awards after being removed in 2014.

Awards and nominations per production

Individuals with multiple nominations
 3: Ann Roth
 2: Peggy Eisenhauer and Jules Fisher; Jonathan Fensom, Christopher Gattelli, Casey Nicholaw, Scott Pask and David Zinn

Reception
The show received a positive reception from many media publications. On Metacritic, the ceremony has a weighted average score of 79 out of 100, based 5 reviews, indicating "generally favorable reviews". The Hollywood Reporter columnist David Rooney remarked, "Bareilles and Groban aced their duties on their own terms, displaying terrific chemistry and making it less about themselves than their infectious enthusiasm as out-and-proud theater geeks." The New York Times theatre critic Mike Hale commented, "The just-happy-to-be-here, can't-we-all-get-along vibe was set by the opening song, a celebration of the ceremony's also-rans — 'This one's for the loser inside of you' — sung by the hosts, Sara Bareilles and Josh Groban, and a chorus made up of ensemble members from every Broadway musical. It was a charming, if not particularly memorable, number. That could also describe the performances of Ms. Bareilles and Mr. Groban, who were a likable and entertaining pair. The show as a whole ran like clockwork, without any significant gaffes but also no particularly memorable outbreaks of emotion or eccentricity." Daniel D'Addario from Variety wrote, "Throughout, Groban and Bareilles kept up this happily effervescent, optimistic but never cloying energy — up until the show's end, when they reprised their opening number as a call to arms for all who work in the theater, or hope to. It was a sweet debut performance by hosts who may well be back at Radio City next June, should the Tonys be so lucky."

In addition, Kristen Baldwin from Entertainment Weekly gave the show a B+, expanding in her review, "Hosts Josh Groban and Sara Bareilles kicked off the 72nd annual Tony Awards with the mix of showmanship, self-deprecating humor, and good-natured egalitarianism that would continue throughout the night." Deadline Hollywood critic Dino-Ray Ramos commented, "Bareilles and Groban live on the border of radio-friendly music and the Broadway stage, and they served as delightful cruise directors, devoid of forced jokes and corny antics. Instead, they leaned into their musical theater geekiness, which was infectious. As a hosting duo, they did their job effortlessly and well, staying in their lane by not doing too much or too little. They were pitch perfect — pun intended." Television critic Jessica Gelt of the Los Angeles Times remarked, "hosts Josh Groban and Sara Bareilles leavened the evening with well-measured comedy."

Ratings
The ceremony averaged a Nielsen 4.8 ratings/11 share, and was watched by 6.3 million viewers. The ratings was a 5 percent increase from previous ceremony's viewership of 6 million, becoming the highest since 2016.

In Memoriam
The cast of Dear Evan Hansen sang "For Forever" as images of theatre personalities who had died in the past year were shown.

Barbara Cook
Thomas Meehan
John "Corky" Boyd
Nanette Fabray
Patricia Morison
Frank Corsaro
Danny Daniels
Gemze de Lappe
Roy Dotrice
Michael Friedman
Peter Hall
A. R. Gurney
John Heard
Earle Hyman
Albert Innaurato
Stephen J. Albert
John Mahoney
Mark Schlegel
Rachel Rockwell
John Heyman
Donald McKayle
David Ogden Stiers
Soon-Tek Oh
Bernard Pomerance
Harvey Schmidt
Sam Shepard
Liz Smith
Richard Wilbur
Louis Zorich
Joseph Bologna
Sammy Williams
Stuart Thompson
Robert Guillaume
Jan Maxwell

See also
 Drama Desk Awards
 2018 Laurence Olivier Awards – equivalent awards for West End theatre productions
 Obie Award
 New York Drama Critics' Circle
 Theatre World Award
 Lucille Lortel Awards

References

External links
 

2018 awards in the United States
2018 in New York City
2010s in Manhattan
2018 theatre awards
June 2018 events in the United States
Tony Awards ceremonies
Television shows directed by Glenn Weiss